Replugged Live is the second live album by the pop-metal band Tesla. Tesla recorded the first half of their 12-month 2001 Replugged Reunion Tour. Recording started in Detroit, Michigan. A fan poll was set up on the band's website to see what tracks the fans would like to see on the double live album. Professional music photographer Gino Carlini was brought on to the tour to photograph the album cover and packaging. The cover image is from their show at The Pageant theater in St. Louis, Missouri. A shortened version of the album called Standing Room Only was released on March 5, 2002.

Track listing

Disc One:
 "Cumin' Atcha Live" (Frank Hannon, Jeff Keith, Brian Wheat) – 6:58
 "EZ Come EZ Go" (Hannon, Keith, Troy Luccketta, Tommy Skeoch, Wheat) – 3:44
 "Hang Tough" (Hannon, Keith, Skeoch, Wheat) – 4:49
 "Gettin' Better" (Hannon, Keith) – 3:56
 "The Way It Is" (Hannon, Keith, Luccketta, Skeoch) – 6:17
 "Song and Emotion" (Michael Barbiero, Hannon, Keith, Skeoch) – 6:35
 "Changes" (Hannon, Keith, Luccketta, Skeoch, Wheat) – 5:06
 "Call It What You Want" (Barbiero, Keith, Wheat) – 4:33
 "Lazy Days, Crazy Nights" (Keith, Skeoch) – 4:27
 "We're No Good Together" (Hannon, Keith, Luccketta) – 5:54

Disc Two:
 "Heaven's Trail [No Way Out]" (Keith, Skeoch) – 5:28
 "Mama's Fool" (Hannon, Keith) – 7:02
 "Freedom Slaves" (Keith, Hannon, Skeoch, Wheat) – 7:39
 "Signs" (Les Emmerson) – 4:09
 "Little Suzi" (Jim Diamond, Tony Hymas) – 4:08
 "What You Give" (Keith, Hannon) – 7:07
 "Summer's Day" (Hannon) – 3:01
 "Love Song" (Hannon, Keith) – 6:57
 "Edison's Medicine" (Barbiero, Hannon, Keith, Skeoch, Wheat) – 5:13
 "Modern Day Cowboy" (Hannon, Keith, Skeoch) – 6:26

Standing Room Only:
 Cumin' Atcha Live
 Hang Tough
 Gettin' Better
 The Way It Is
 Song & Emotion
 Heaven's Trail (No Way Out)
 Mama's Fool
 Freedom Slaves
 Signs
 Little Suzie
 What You Give
 Love Song
 Modern Day Cowboy

Charts

References

2001 live albums
Tesla (band) live albums